Sarah Cahill may refer to:

 Sarah Cahill (model) (born 1978), American model, actress, and beauty pageant titleholder
 Sarah Cahill (pianist) (born 1960), American pianist